Eslamabad (also Romanized as Eslāmābād) is a village in Soveyseh Rural District, in the Soveyseh District of Karun County, Khuzestan Province, Iran. At the 2006 census, its population was 1,393, in 296 families.

References 

Populated places in Karun County